William Holman (1871–1934) was the Premier of New South Wales, Australia.

William Holman may also refer to:

Bill Holman (musician) (born 1927), American saxophonist, composer, arranger
Bill Holman (cartoonist) (1903–1987), creator of the comic strip Smokey Stover
William S. Holman (1822–1897), lawyer, judge and politician from Dearborn County, Indiana
William Alfred Holman (1864–1949), New Zealand architect
Willie Holman (1945–2002), American football player
William Holman (MP for Dorchester)